The men's javelin throw at the 2015 World Championships in Athletics was held at the Beijing National Stadium on 24 and 26 August.

Two years earlier, Julius Yego was notable in fourth place, as a Kenyan athlete succeeding in a different event, one unrelated to distance running.  His 85.40 national record put him one throw away from a medal.  Since then, he has added six more metres to his record and came into this championship as the world leader and favorite.  Vítězslav Veselý was back as the defending champion as was silver medalist Tero Pitkämäki.  Dmitriy Tarabin, whose final throw took the bronze medal away from Yego and Olympic champion Keshorn Walcott did not make the final this time.

In the first round of the final Thomas Röhler took the lead with an 86.68.  In the second round, Ihab El-Sayed took the lead with his season best 88.99.	
Meanwhile, Yego fouled his first attempt and his 82.45 only had him in 5th place and highly vulnerable to not making the top 8 after three throws, the requirement to get three more throws.  On his third throw, he launched a 92.72.  Not only did the throw put him in the lead, it was a new African record and the farthest throw in the world in 14 years, since world record holder Jan Železný threw 92.80 to win this championship in 2001, near the end of his top throwing days.	
It made Yego the third farthest thrower in the history of the contemporary javelin.  He didn't need any more throws.  In the fourth round Pitkämäki threw 87.64 to move into bronze medal position, which was confirmed when Röhler came up short in his effort to answer.

Records
Prior to the competition, the records were as follows:

Qualification standards

Schedule

Results

Qualification
Qualification: 83.00 m (Q) or at least 12 best performers (q).

Final
The final was started at 19:05.

References

Javelin throw
Javelin throw at the World Athletics Championships